Rename may refer to:

 Rename (computing), rename of a file on a computer
 RENAME (command), command to rename a file in various operating systems
 Rename (relational algebra), unary operation in relational algebra
 Company renaming, rename of a product
 Name change, rename of a person
 Geographical renaming, rename of a geographical location

See also
 Renaming (disambiguation)